Argna bielzi is a species of air-breathing land snail, a terrestrial pulmonate gastropod mollusk in the family Argnidae.

Distribution 
This species occurs in Slovakia, Ukraine and other countries.

References

External links 
 http://www.animalbase.uni-goettingen.de/zooweb/servlet/AnimalBase/home/species?id=1935

Argnidae
Gastropods described in 1859